Nimno is a small settlement in the Municipality of Rogaška Slatina in eastern Slovenia, right on the border with Croatia. The entire area belongs to the traditional Styria region and is now included in the Savinja Statistical Region.

References

External links
Nimno on Geopedia

Populated places in the Municipality of Rogaška Slatina